Kalateh-ye Saqi (also Romanized as Kalāteh-ye Sāqī; also known as Kalāteh-ye Eqbāl) is a village in Ordughesh Rural District, Zeberkhan District, Nishapur County, Razavi Khorasan Province, Iran. At the 2006 census, its population was 227, in 70 families.

References 

Populated places in Nishapur County